Bizyar is a rural locality (a selo) in Palnikovskoye Rural Settlement, Permsky District, Perm Krai, Russia. The population was 70 as of 2010. There are 10 streets.

Geography 
Bizyar is located 75 km south of Perm (the district's administrative centre) by road. Sukhobizyarka is the nearest rural locality.

References 

Rural localities in Permsky District